RDC may refer to:

Transportation 
 Budd Rail Diesel Car, a self-propelled rail car
 Railroad Development Corporation, an American holding company for foreign railroads
 RDC, station code for Redditch railway station in Great Britain
 RDC, IATA code for Redenção Airport in Brazil

Entertainment 
 Radio Drama Company, the BBC troupe which performs radio drama

Science and technology 
 Remote Differential Compression, a file synchronization technology in Microsoft Windows
 Remote Desktop Connection, client software for Microsoft Remote Desktop Services
 Remote deposit capture, an electronic banking technology
 Research Diagnostic Criteria, a collection of psychiatric diagnostic criteria
 Residual dipolar coupling, a measurand in NMR spectroscopy

Government 
 Rassemblement Démocratique Centrafricain (Central African Democratic Rally), a political party in the Central African Republic
 Regional Development Corporation, a crown corporation in New Brunswick, Canada
 Representative Democratic Council, an advisory group to the post-World War II US military government of South Korea
 Research & Development Corporation Newfoundland and Labrador (2008-2017), a former crown corporation in Newfoundland, Canada
 Rural district council (1894-1974), former class of local government body in the UK and Ireland
 Rural Research and Development Corporation (RDC), such as AgriFutures Australia, set up by the Australian Government

Other 
 Democratic Republic of the Congo (La République Democratique du Congo), a country
 Recruit division commander, a drill instructor for the United States Navy
 Red Deer College, a community college in Red Deer, Alberta, Canada
 "Right down canyon" in canyoning